Chaser News Alert was an Australian satirical news program which ran in the form of ten 4-minute episodes produced by satire group The Chaser. It aired on ABC2 from 22 September 2005 to 24 November and was also available via the Australian Broadcasting Corporation's broadband site.

Episodes

See also

External links
 Chaser News Alert episodes on ABC Broadband

The Chaser